In logic, converse nonimplication is a logical connective which is the negation of converse implication (equivalently, the negation of the converse of implication).

Definition

Truth table

Notation
Converse nonimplication is notated , which is the left arrow from converse implication, negated with a stroke.

Alternatives include
 , which combines converse implication's , negated with a stroke.
 , which combines converse implication's left arrow with negation's tilde.
 Mpq, in Bocheński notation

Properties

falsehood-preserving: The interpretation under which all variables are assigned a truth value of 'false' produces a truth value of 'false' as a result of converse nonimplication

Natural language

Grammatical

Example,

If it rains (P) then I get wet (Q), just because I am wet (Q) does not mean it is raining, in reality I went to a pool party with the co-ed staff, in my clothes (~P) and that is why I am facilitating this lecture in this state (Q).

Rhetorical
Q does not imply P.

Colloquial

Boolean algebra

Properties
Non-associative
Hence in a nontrivial Boolean algebra Converse Nonimplication is nonassociative.

Clearly, it is associative if and only if .

Non-commutative

  if and only if  #s6. Hence Converse Nonimplication is noncommutative.

Neutral and absorbing elements

  is a left neutral element and a right absorbing element.
 Implication  is the dual of converse nonimplication  #s7.

Computer science
An example for converse nonimplication in computer science can be found when performing a right outer join on a set of tables from a database, if records not matching the join-condition from the "left" table are being excluded.

References

External links

Logical connectives